The 1945 Tottenham North by-election was a by-election held for the British House of Commons constituency of Tottenham North in London on 13 December 1945.

Vacancy 
The seat had become vacant when the sitting Labour Co-operative Member of Parliament (MP), Robert Morrison had been ennobled on 16 November 1945 as Baron Morrison. He had held the seat since the 1935 general election.

Candidates 
The Labour Co-operative candidate was 53-year-old William Irving. The Conservative Party candidate was 26-year-old barrister Petre Crowder.

Result 
On a much-reduced turnout, Irving held the seat for Labour, with a swing of 8.2% to the Conservatives.

The constituency was abolished for the 1950 general election, when Irving was elected for the new Wood Green constituency, and Crowder was elected for the safe Conservative seat of Ruislip-Northwood.

Votes

See also
Tottenham North (UK Parliament constituency)
Tottenham
List of United Kingdom by-elections (1931–1950)

References

Sources 

By-elections to the Parliament of the United Kingdom in London constituencies
1945 elections in the United Kingdom
Elections in the London Borough of Haringey
1945 in London
20th century in Middlesex
Tottenham